The Dancer is a 1915 German silent drama film directed by Georg Jacoby and starring Leopoldine Konstantin, and Bruno Kastner.

It was shot at the Tempelhof Studios in Berlin.

Cast
Adolf Baumann
Ludwig Hartau
Tatjana Irrah
Bruno Kastner
Leopoldine Konstantin
Max Laurence

References

External links

Films of the German Empire
German silent feature films
Films directed by Georg Jacoby
German drama films
1915 drama films
Films shot at Tempelhof Studios
German black-and-white films
1910s dance films
Silent drama films
1910s German films